General Hobson may refer to:

Edward H. Hobson (1825–1901), U.S. Army brigadier general
Frederick Taylor Hobson (1840–1909), British Army major general
Kenneth B. Hobson (1908–1979), U.S. Air Force general